The Alvin Show is an American animated television series that aired on CBS in the early 1960s. This was the first series to feature the singing characters Alvin and the Chipmunks. The Alvin Show aired for one season, from October 4, 1961, to September 12, 1962 and was originally sponsored by General Foods through its Jell-O gelatin and Post Cereal brands. Although the series was created in color, it was initially telecast in black and white. It was later rebroadcast in color from 1962-65 for Saturday mornings on CBS and again Saturday mornings on NBC in 1979.

The series rode the momentum of creator Ross Bagdasarian Sr.'s original hit musical gimmick and developed the singing Chipmunk trio as rambunctious kids–particularly the show's namesake star–whose mischief contrasted to his tall, brainy brother Simon and his chubby, gluttonous brother Theodore, as well as their long-suffering, perpetually put-upon manager-father figure, David Seville. The animation was produced by Herbert Klynn's Format Films. The pilot episode, an early version of the fifth episode "Good Neighbor", was written and produced to sell the show to CBS. The actual show featured a re-worked version, which aired as part of the fifth episode. With producer Fred Calvert (who would later work on The Thief and the Cobbler) calling them in, the opening sequence was animated by Bobe Cannon and assistant animated by Iwao Takamoto.

Each episode consisted of a Chipmunks and Clyde Crashcup segment, both of them seven minutes long. Following each segment was a musical number with Dave and the Chipmunks. Most of the songs came from the first three albums that had already been released by the time the show premiered (Let's All Sing with The Chipmunks, Sing Again with The Chipmunks, and Around the World with The Chipmunks). By the second half, all the songs from the new fifth album, The Chipmunk Songbook, were also featured. In addition to the non-album Alvin for President, three song segments were created that were never officially released on any album or single. They were Clementine, Maria from Madrid, and Jeanie with the Light Brown Hair.

The show was followed in 1983 by another Chipmunks series, Alvin and the Chipmunks which aired on NBC.

Syndication 
CBS reran the series on Saturday mornings after the show's prime time run ended in 1962.

In the mid to late 1960s, the individual show segments were culled together and sold as a syndication package under the title Alvin and the Chipmunks. The original episodes began airing under the Alvin and the Chipmunks title on NBC Saturday mornings in 1979 for a short period.

Ross Bagdasarian Sr. died of a heart attack on January 16, 1972, seemingly bringing to an end any further Chipmunk productions. Years later, his son, Ross Jr., picked up on a disc jockey's joke and produced the album Chipmunk Punk in 1980. The success of Chipmunk Punk spurred renewed interest in a new animated series by Ruby-Spears, which launched in September 1983 on NBC and was titled Alvin and the Chipmunks, with Ross Jr. taking over for his father as the voices of Alvin, Simon, and Dave Seville. His wife, Janice Karman, voiced Theodore, as well as The Chipettes, who are the Chipmunks' female counterparts. The show ran until 1990, with episodes after 1988 produced by DIC Entertainment. (Eleven episodes were produced by Murakami-Wolf-Swenson in association with DIC; these were strictly for a syndication package that included all of the Ruby-Spears produced by episodes.)

To coincide with the new series, Viacom Enterprises distributed reruns of The Alvin Show to local (mostly independent and future Fox) stations; the rerun package was also carried nationally over superstations WGN and WTBS at various times beginning in September 1983 and ran for mostly a few years on half of the markets. However, some stations continue to run the show at various times as late as 1993. Prior to its superstation runs, The Alvin Show was picked up in a few markets such as Detroit, New York, Cleveland, and in international markets such as in Australia and Brazil among others. The show made its way to Europe in the United Kingdom when the BBC (now BBC One) began broadcasting the program as well.

In 1981, Clyde Crashcup made an appearance during a dream sequence in A Chipmunk Christmas. During recent network airings of the special, the sequence has been cut out, due to network time constraints concerning commercial ad time.

In 1990, The Alvin Show versions of the Chipmunks and Clyde Crashcup reappeared in an episode of The Chipmunks Go To the Movies titled "Back to Alvin’s Future" (a spoof of the 1985 movie, Back to the Future).

A majority of the songs and clips from The Alvin Show were featured in the Alvin and the Chipmunks Sing Along Songs VHS releases that were released in the mid-1990s. The songs, however, were slightly remixed to sound more modern. The only song that kept its original broadcast soundtrack was "Alvin's Orchestra" in the 1993 Sing-Along video Ragtime Cowboy Joe. The Bagdasarian closing logo from the show was also remixed in the 1994 Sing Along video, Working on the Railroad.

Nickelodeon picked up US broadcast rights to The Alvin Show on March 7, 1994, after the last of a few independent stations pulled the show. The prints from the syndicated reruns were digitized and the Nickelodeon logo was added to several spots in the opening theme. The show aired as part of Nickelodeon’s morning lineup for most of the next year. 

During this time, as well as for sometime after the full episodes stopped airing, the individual Chipmunk and Clyde Crashcup cartoons and musical segments were inserted into episodes of Weinerville. In 1996, Nickelodeon stopped showing The Alvin Show segments altogether and no television station has aired them since then.

Voice cast 
 Ross Bagdasarian Sr. - Alvin Seville, Simon Seville, Theodore Seville, David Seville, Sam Valiant, Gondaliero; additional voices
 Shepard Menken - Clyde Crashcup, Neighbor; additional voices
 June Foray - Daisy Bell, Mrs. Frumpington; additional voices
 Bill Lee - Additional voices
 Johnny Mann - Additional voices
 Lee Patrick - Mrs. Frumpington; additional voices

Episodes (1961–1962) 
26 episodes each were produced for the Alvin and the Chipmunks and Clyde Crashcup segments, along with 52 musical segments.

General Foods was the show's main sponsor; as such, Dave Seville and The Chipmunks appeared in several humorous half-minute commercials for Jell-O and Post Cereals.

Home media 
Other than the two VHS releases from Buena Vista Home Video, both of which featured 11 songs from The Alvin Show, up until recently, the show has never been released on DVD. However, on September 8, 2009, Paramount Home Entertainment released the first episode of the show, along with two "modern" specials. A future "Complete Series" DVD set of the series has not been planned. In 2014, "The Brave Chipmunks" musical sequence was released as a bonus feature on The Chipmunk Adventure Blu-ray and DVD combo pack. In 2015, three complete episodes (#01, #04, and #10) were released together as The Alvin Show on Blu-ray and DVD.

International broadcast 

 Australia
 Network Ten (1973 & 1997-2001)
 Nickelodeon (2002-2004)
 Canada
 CBMT (1966)
 WHTV (Whitehorse Cable System) (1960s)
 Chile
 TVN (1969–1973 & 1975–1979)
 Russia
 Channel One Russia (1992–1996)
 Russia-1 (1996–1998)
 United Kingdom
 BBC (1962)
 Nickelodeon (1995–1997)
 Cartoon Network (1997–2000)
 Toon Disney (2000–2004)
 France
 France 3 (1976–1982)
 TF1 (1982–1990)
 Italy
 Hiro (1980)
 Italia 7 (1980)
 Portugal
 RTP (1990)
 TVI (1999)

Syndicated stations

 WTBS-TV - Atlanta, Georgia
 WGN-TV - Chicago, Illinois
 WNEW-TV - New York City (first station to run the show as a syndicated series on weekday afternoons in 1965, shortly before CBS cancelled its run as a Saturday Morning program)
 KTVU-TV - San Francisco, California
 WSFL-TV - Miami, Florida
 WXIX-TV - Cincinnati, Ohio
 KXTX-TV - Dallas, Texas
 WVTV-TV - Milwaukee, Wisconsin
 WGBS-TV - Philadelphia, Pennsylvania
 WXNE-TV - Boston, Massachusetts
 WTXX-TV - Hartford, Connecticut
 WTOP-TV - Washington, District of Columbia (aired on Sunday mornings from January until September 1970)
 WFTY-TV - Washington, District of Columbia
 WPTT-TV - Pittsburgh, Pennsylvania
 WTTE-TV - Columbus, Ohio
 WKBF-TV - Cleveland, Ohio
 WKBD-TV - Detroit, Michigan
 WPTF-TV - Raleigh, North Carolina (aired on Sundays in the mid-1980s)
 KZKC-TV - Kansas City, Missouri
 WISH-TV - Indianapolis, Indiana (ran as a syndicated program before CBS's Saturday Morning block in the early 1990s)
 WFTS-TV - Tampa, Florida
 WTZA-TV - Kingston, New York
 WOLF-TV - Scranton, Pennsylvania

See also 
Alvin and the Chipmunks (1983 TV series)
Alvin and the Chipmunks (2015 TV series)

References

External links 

 Alvin and the Chipmunks page at Toonopedia
 
 

Alvin and the Chipmunks
1960s American animated television series
1960s American musical comedy television series
1961 American television series debuts
1962 American television series endings
American children's animated comedy television series
American children's animated musical television series
Animated television series about brothers
Animated television series about children
Animated television series about mammals
CBS original programming
English-language television shows
Television series by CBS Studios
Television series by Format Films
Television series created by Ross Bagdasarian